Vietbocap thienduongensis (Vietnamese: Bọ cạp Thiên Đường, literally "Paradise scorpion") is a species of scorpion in the family Pseudochactidae. This species was described by Phạm Đình Sắc (Institute of Ecology and Biological Resources (IEBR), an organ under the Vietnam Academy of Science and Technology (VAST)) and Wilson Lourenço (Paris Museum of Natural History – National Museum of Natural History) inside Thiên Đường Cave, a cave located in Phong Nha-Kẻ Bàng National Park, Quảng Bình Province, Vietnam.

References

Pseudochactidae
Scorpions of Asia
Arthropods of Vietnam
Endemic fauna of Vietnam
Quảng Bình province
2012 in Vietnam
Animals described in 2012
Taxa named by Wilson R. Lourenço